Qotbabad is a city in Fars Province, Iran.

Qotbababad may also refer to:
Qotbabad, Hormozgan
Qotbabad, Kerman
Qotbabad, Markazi
Qotbabad Rural District, in Fars Province